Araw Roudbar (also Romanized as Araw Roudbar ) is a village in Syrvan Rural District, Syrvan County, Ilam Province, Iran. At the 2006 census, its population was 172, in 31 families.

References 

Towns and villages in Kuhdasht County